Elachista arena is a moth of the family Elachistidae that is endemic to Nevada.

The forewings are narrow. The ground colour is white, powdered with dark grey scales especially along the costa and the dorsal margin, and with four irregular dark grey stripes. The hindwings are grey and translucent and the underside of the wings is grey.

Etymology
The species name is derived from Latin arena (meaning sand).

References

Moths described in 1997
Moths of North America
Endemic fauna of the United States
arena